The teams competing in Group 7 of the 2015 UEFA European Under-21 Championships qualifying competition were Sweden, Turkey, Greece, Poland and Malta.

The ten group winners and the four best second-placed teams advanced to the play-offs.

Standings

Results and fixtures
All times are CEST (UTC+02:00) during summer and CET (UTC+01:00) during winter.

The match was abandoned after 21 minutes due to tear gas in the stadium, and was resumed on 19:00, from the point of abandonment.

Goalscorers
9 goals
 Arkadiusz Milik

6 goals
 Nikolaos Karelis

4 goals

 John Guidetti
 Emrah Başsan

3 goals

 Dimitris Diamantakos
 Giannis Gianniotas
 Dimitris Kolovos
 Kristoffer Olsson
 Musa Çağıran
 Kerim Koyunlu

2 goals

 Ioannis Potouridis
 Michal Chrapek
 Bartłomiej Pawłowski
 Branimir Hrgota
 Mikael Ishak
 Isaac Kiese Thelin
 Ömer Ali Şahiner
 Enes Ünal

1 goal

 Andreas Bouchalakis
 Stelios Kitsiou
 Charalampos Mavrias
 Stephen Pisani
 Ryan Scicluna
 Dominik Furman
 Kacper Przybyłko
 Michał Żyro
 Viktor Claesson
 Simon Gustafson
 Melker Hallberg
 Oscar Hiljemark
 Alexander Milošević
 Christoffer Nyman
 Simon Thern
 Muhammet Demir
 Bertul Kocabaş

1 own goal
 Alexander Milošević (against Poland)

References

External links
Standings and fixtures at UEFA.com

Group 7